Casalvecchio is the name of two places in Italy:

Casalvecchio di Puglia in the province of Foggia (Apulia)
Casalvecchio Siculo in the province of Messina (Sicily)